General elections were held in Liechtenstein on 11 March 1918, with a second round on 18 March. They were the first elections held in the country contested by political parties, as the Christian-Social People's Party and Progressive Citizens' Party had been founded that year. The Progressive Citizens' Party emerged as the largest in the Landtag, winning seven of the 12 elected seats.

Electoral system
The electoral system was changed prior to the 1918 elections to allow for direct elections using a majoritarian system, and led to the creation of the new parties. The country was divided into two constituencies, with Oberland electing seven members and three substitutes and Unterland electing five members and two substitutes. Voters wrote down the names of as many candidates as there were seats on the ballot paper, and after assembling in the polling station, were called by name to cast their ballot. If fewer candidates than the number of seats received over 50% of the vote, a second round was held in which the number of candidates was double the number of remaining seats. The remaining three seats were appointed by the Prince.

Only men aged 24 or over were allowed to vote.

Results

By electoral district

First round

Second round

References

Liechtenstein
1918 in Liechtenstein
Elections in Liechtenstein
March 1918 events
Election and referendum articles with incomplete results